Svetlana Kuznetsova was the defending champion, but chose not to participate that year.

Caroline Wozniacki won in the final 3–6, 6–4, 6–1, against Anna Chakvetadze.

Seeds
The top four seeds received a bye into the second round.

Draw

Finals

Top half

Bottom half

External links
 WTA tournament draws

Women's Singles
Pilot Pen Tennis